David Botstein (born September 8, 1942) is an American biologist serving as the chief scientific officer of Calico. He served as the director of the Lewis-Sigler Institute for Integrative Genomics at Princeton University from 2003 to 2013, where he remains an Anthony B. Evnin Professor of Genomics.

Education
Botstein graduated from the Bronx High School of Science in 1959, and Harvard University in 1963. He started his Ph.D. work under Maurice Sanford Fox at the Massachusetts Institute of Technology, then moved and received a Ph.D. from the University of Michigan in 1967 for work on P22 phage.

Career
Botstein taught at the Massachusetts Institute of Technology, where he became a professor of genetics. Botstein joined Genentech, Inc. in 1987 as vice president – science. In 1990, he became chairman of the Department of Genetics at Stanford University. Botstein was elected to the U.S. National Academy of Sciences in 1981 and to the Institute of Medicine in 1993.

Botstein is the director of the Integrated Science Program at Princeton University. Many Integrated Science students have gone on to be successful in the field of molecular biology.

In 1980, Botstein and his colleagues Ray White, Mark Skolnick, and Ronald W. Davis proposed a method for constructing a genetic linkage map using restriction fragment length polymorphisms that was used in subsequent years to identify several human disease genes including Huntington's and BRCA1.  Variations of this method were used in the mapping efforts that predated and enabled the sequencing phase of the Human Genome Project.

In 1998, Botstein and his postdoctoral fellow Michael Eisen, together with graduate student Paul Spellman and colleague Patrick Brown, developed a statistical method and graphical interface that is widely used to interpret genomic data including microarray data. This approach was refined and applied for diverse applications, including for a molecular classification of heterogenous tumors using gene expression. These efforts included work on discovery of tumor subtypes with Lou Staudt, Ash Alizadeh and Ronald Levy, yielding a refined  classification of diffuse large B cell lymphomas, and in painting the molecular portraits for refined classification of breast cancers with Anne-Lise Børresen-Dale and Charles Perou.  He has subsequently worked on the creation of the influential Gene Ontology with Michael Ashburner and Suzanna Lewis. He is one of the founding editors of the journal Molecular Biology of the Cell, along with Erkki Ruoslahti and Keith Yamamoto.

In 2013, Botstein was named chief scientific officer of Google's anti-aging health startup Calico.

Awards
Botstein has won the Eli Lilly and Company Award in Microbiology (1978), the Genetics Society of America Medal (1988, with Ira Herskowitz), the Allan Award of the American Society of Human Genetics (1989, with Ray White), the Gruber Prize in Genetics (2003), the Albany Medical Center Prize (2010, with Eric Lander and Francis Collins) and the Dan David Prize in 2012. In 2013 he was awarded the $3 million Breakthrough Prize in Life Sciences for his work and in 2020 the Thomas Hunt Morgan Medal of the Genetics Society of America. In 2016, Semantic Scholar AI program included Botstein on its list of most top ten most influential biomedical researchers.

Personal
Botstein is an alumnus of Camp Rising Sun. He is the brother of the conductor Leon Botstein.  Both of Botstein's parents were physicians.

References

External links
David Botstein's Talk: "An Integrated Science Curriculum"
David Botstein iBiology Seminar: "Fruits of the Genome Sequence"
 David Botstein personal archives, MC-0227. Massachusetts Institute of Technology, Department of Distinctive Collections, Cambridge, Massachusetts.

1942 births
The Bronx High School of Science alumni
Living people
Harvard University alumni
University of Michigan alumni
Camp Rising Sun alumni
American geneticists
Jewish American scientists
20th-century Swiss people
Members of the United States National Academy of Sciences
Genentech people
Stanford University School of Medicine faculty
American biotechnologists
Biogerontologists
Princeton University faculty
Stanford University faculty
Academic journal editors
American print editors
Media founders
American microbiologists
Fellows of the AACR Academy
Scientists from New York (state)
American scientists
Fellows of the American Academy of Microbiology
21st-century American Jews
Members of the National Academy of Medicine